An aerodrome is any place at which flight operations take place. In British English, it refers chiefly to a small airport or airfield.

Aerodrome or airdrome may refer to:

Aviation

Aerodromes, various heavier-than-air flying machines, including those built by the Canadian Aerial Experiment Association
Langley Aerodrome, a pioneering but unsuccessful series of powered flying machines designed at the close of the 19th century by Smithsonian Institution Secretary Samuel Langley
 Terminal aerodrome forecast, an international format for reporting aviation weather forecast information

Brands and enterprises
 Aerodrome, an ice-skating rink in Houston, Texas
The Aerodrome (nightclub), a former nightclub in Schenectady, New York
 Airdrome, Richard and Maurice McDonald's first food venture, a hotdog stand in Monrovia, California, before moving the entire building to San Bernardino in 1940 and renaming it McDonald's

Other uses
 The Aerodrome, a 1941 novel by Rex Warner